Diana Hartog (born 1942 in Palo Alto, California) is a Canadian poet and fiction writer. She won the Gerald Lampert Award in 1983 for her poetry collection Matinee Light, and the Dorothy Livesay Poetry Prize in 1987 for Candy from Strangers.

She was also a shortlisted nominee for the Journey Prize in 1991 for her short story "Theories of Grief", and for the Dorothy Livesay Prize in 1993 for Polite to Bees: A Bestiary.

She published the novel The Photographer's Sweethearts in 1996, and a new poetry collection, Ink Monkey, in 2006.

She lives in New Denver, British Columbia.

References

20th-century Canadian poets
20th-century Canadian novelists
20th-century Canadian short story writers
21st-century Canadian poets
Canadian women poets
Canadian women novelists
Canadian women short story writers
Writers from British Columbia
American emigrants to Canada
Living people
1942 births
People from Sonora, California
Poets from California
21st-century Canadian women writers
20th-century Canadian women writers
21st-century Canadian short story writers